, was an entrepreneur, politician and cabinet minister in the Empire of Japan, serving eight terms as a member of the Lower House of the Diet of Japan, and twice times as a cabinet minister. He also served twice in the post-war Lower House of the Diet.

Biography 
Kanemitsu was born in Ōita Prefecture. He served as a bureaucrat in the tax offices of Nagasaki, Fukuoka and Kumamoto before he was hired by the zaibatsu, Suzuki Shōten in 1908. In 1913, he transferred to Taishō Life Insurance Company, and became its president. In addition, he was on the board of directors for the Nipponkōa Insurance Company.  Kanemitsu was subsequently also president of Ōji Electric Tram Company and Vice-Chairman of the Japan Chamber of Commerce and Industry.

His political career began in 1920 General Election, when he was elected to a seat in the Lower House of the Diet of Japan under the Rikken Seiyūkai political party. He was subsequently re-elected a total of nine times from the same district. In 1937, he was Vice-Speaker of the House.

In 1939, Kanemitsu was appointed as Minister of Colonial Affairs under the Abe administration. The same year, he formed his own political faction (together with Takeru Inukai), supporting Fumimaro Konoe's Shintaisei movement, and facilitated meetings with General Akira Mutō of the Imperial Japanese Army General Staff to ensure military support for the movement. In September 1940, under the 2nd Konoe administration, Kanemitsu was appointed Minister of Welfare. He subsequently served as chairman of policy research and in other posts within the Taisei Yokusankai.

Following the end of World War II, Kanemitsu joined the Nihon Shimpotō political party, but was unable to run for office as he had been purged by the Supreme Commander of the Allied Powers along with all other government officials and ranking members of the Taisei Yokusankai, so he had his son run in his place. He was able to resume his seat in the Lower House following the 1953 General Election after the end of the occupation of Japan as a member of the Liberal Party. Kanemitsu died in 1955. His grave is at the Tama Reien Cemetery in Fuchū, Tokyo.

References

1877 births
1955 deaths
People from Ōita Prefecture
Members of the House of Representatives (Empire of Japan)
Government ministers of Japan
Rikken Seiyūkai politicians
Imperial Rule Assistance Association politicians
Liberal Party (Japan, 1945) politicians
Members of the House of Representatives (Japan)